Ceromitia aphroneura is a species of moth of the  family Adelidae. It is known from Mozambique.

References

Adelidae
Endemic fauna of Mozambique
Lepidoptera of Mozambique
Moths described in 1930